Ken Duncan is a former punter in the National Football League.

Biography
Duncan was born on February 28, 1946, in Rock Island, Illinois.

Career
Duncan was drafted in the seventeenth round of the 1971 NFL Draft and played that season with the Green Bay Packers. He played at the collegiate level at the University of Tulsa.

See also
List of Green Bay Packers players

References

1946 births
Living people
Sportspeople from Rock Island, Illinois
Players of American football from Illinois
Green Bay Packers players
American football punters
Tulsa Golden Hurricane football players